Florian Gothe (born 9 August 1962 in Bochum) is a retired German football defender. and current President of the Vereinigung der Vertragsfußballspieler (VDV).

Career
Gothe, who started playing football at the age of eight at Post SV Bochum, played a total of 196 games in the Bundesliga and 2. Bundesliga between 1983 and 1991, in which he scored 16 goals.

In 1999, the former VfL Bochum professional was elected President of the Vereinigung der Vertragsfußballspieler (VDV) to succeed Jürgen Sparwasser. Under his leadership, the organization was able to emerge from what was then an existential crisis. When he was re-elected in 2006, he was unanimously confirmed in office.

In November 2009, Gothe appeared publicly when, in connection with the suicide of the German soccer goalkeeper Robert Enke, he spoke out in favour of greater support for soccer players in overcoming personal psychological problems.

Miscellaneous
In addition to his career as a soccer player, he successfully completed his law studies and now works as a notary in Solingen. In addition, Florian Gothe is an honorary judge at the DFB Federal Court.

References

External links
 
 Munzinger Archiv

1962 births
Living people
Sportspeople from Bochum
German footballers
Bundesliga players
2. Bundesliga players
VfL Bochum players
VfL Bochum II players
Rot-Weiß Oberhausen players
1. FC Saarbrücken players
Association football defenders
Footballers from North Rhine-Westphalia